Andrew Michael Peter May (born 26 February 1964) is an English former professional footballer who played in the Football League for Manchester City, Huddersfield Town, Bolton Wanderers, Bristol City and Millwall. In October 1995 he joined Larne of the Irish Football League for a loan spell, and he played once for Welling United in the 1995–96 Football Conference. He was capped once for England at under-21 level, in the semi-final of the 1986 European Championship.

After his playing career had ended he held coaching positions at Altrincham, Wigan Athletic, Stockport County and F.C. Halifax Town.

References

1964 births
Living people
Footballers from Bury, Greater Manchester
English footballers
England under-21 international footballers
Association football midfielders
Manchester City F.C. players
Huddersfield Town A.F.C. players
Bolton Wanderers F.C. players
Bristol City F.C. players
Millwall F.C. players
Larne F.C. players
Welling United F.C. players
English Football League players
NIFL Premiership players
National League (English football) players